The 1981 Badminton World Cup was the third edition of an international tournament Badminton World Cup. The event was held in Kuala Lumpur, Malaysia from 7 October to 11 October 1981. Competitions for doubles were not conducted. India won men's singles event while China won women's singles event.

Medalists

Men's singles

Women's singles

References 
 https://web.archive.org/web/20061214225106/http://tangkis.tripod.com/world/1981.htm
 Prakash powers through
 Prakash has the last word

Badminton World Cup
1981 in badminton
1981 in Malaysian sport
Sport in Kuala Lumpur
International sports competitions hosted by Malaysia